"Orange Colored Sky" is a popular song written by Milton Delugg and Willie Stein and published in 1950. The first known recording was on July 11, 1950, on KING records catalog number 15061, with Janet Brace singing and Milton Delugg conducting the orchestra.

Nat King Cole recording
The best-known version of the song was recorded by Nat King Cole (with Stan Kenton's orchestra) on August 16, 1950, and released by Capitol Records as catalog number 1184. It first reached the Billboard Best Seller chart on September 22, 1950, and lasted 13 weeks on the chart, peaking at number 11. (Some sites list a 1945 date for this recording, but this is apparently in error.) but a number of other singers have recorded it, including Cole's daughter, Natalie.

Other recordings
The recording by Jerry Lester was released by Coral Records as catalog number 60325. It first reached the Billboard Best Seller chart on November 24, 1950, and lasted one week in the chart, peaking at number 30. Jerry Lester was the host of the late-night NBC series Broadway Open House, on which co-writer Delugg was musical director. Because of the exposure that the song received on that show, "Orange Colored Sky" has been said to be one of the first songs to become a hit through television exposure.
Danny Kaye and Patty Andrews recorded the song on September 28, 1950, in a version released by Decca Records as catalog number 27261.
Doris Day recorded the song with the Page Cavanaugh Trio on August 21, 1950, in a version released by Columbia Records as catalog number 38980 for the 78rpm version and 6-811 for the 45rpm version. 
A version of this song was recorded by Screamin' Jay Hawkins.
An Australian recording of the song was made by Larry Stellar, with Les Welch and his orchestra, in January 1951, and released by the Australian company, Pacific Records, as catalog number 10-0052.
Actor Burt Ward of Batman fame recorded a series of tracks under the production of Frank Zappa in 1966; one of the songs was "Orange Colored Sky". It was released as a 7" single (MGM K 13632).
German songwriter and composer Bert Kaempfert released a 1971 album entitled Orange Colored Sky. 
Tony-nominated actress Alison Fraser included the song on her solo album A New York Romance.
Richard Thompson covered the song on his album 1000 Years of Popular Music. 
Japanese jazz singer Meg covered it on her 2006 album Grace. 
In 2006, a version of the song by Paul Anka was included on the soundtrack of the film Confetti. 
Michael Bublé recorded a version of this song as a bonus track on his 2007 album Call Me Irresponsible.
Lady Gaga covered this song during a surprise appearance at The Oak Room in New York City on September 29, 2010, and again on January 5, 2011. Brian Newman served as a guest performer on trumpet for performances at the Robin Hood Gala on May 9, 2011, to benefit the Robin Hood Foundation and at BBC Radio 1's Big Weekend in Carlisle, England, on May 15, 2011. She then performed it as several other dates, including the ABC special A Very Gaga Thanksgiving. She then recorded the song as a track for her first Christmas EP, A Very Gaga Holiday.

Popular culture
Burt Ward's co-star, Adam West, also performed the song live in his Batman costume on a 1966 episode of Hollywood Palace.
The song was sung by Lynda Carter with various Muppets in a fourth season episode of The Muppet Show. 
In the movie The Majestic, Jim Carrey's character listens to the tune while driving his convertible in Hollywood.
The video games Fallout 4 and Fallout 76 feature the Nat King Cole version on the in-game radio station.

References

1950 songs
Lady Gaga songs
Nat King Cole songs
Songs written by Willie Stein
Screamin' Jay Hawkins songs